Miriam Davenport or Miriam Davenport Ebel (June 6, 1915 – September 13, 1999) was an American painter and sculptor who played an important role helping European Jews and intellectuals escape the Holocaust during World War II.

Personal life and education
Miriam Davenport was born on June 6, 1915 in Boston, Massachusetts. Her parents were steam boat captain Howard Ernest Davenport and Florence L. Sparrow Davenport. In 1920 they lived in Delaware City, Delaware. They also had a son, Howard, who was born about 1926. In 1930, the family of four lived in New Rochelle, New York. Her father died on April 30, 1936.

Both of her parents had died with significant debts when Davenport was at Smith College, where she studied architecture and art history. She graduated in 1937 and studied at New York University's Graduate Institute of Fine Arts for one year. Davenport attended the Institut d'Art et d'Archéologie at the Sorbonne in Paris on a Carnegie summer art scholarship. She fell in love with fellow artist, Rudolph Treo, an exile from Yugoslavia.

World War II

With the June 1940 German occupation of France, Davenport fled Paris with Treo and on the journey their paths split and Davenport went first to the city of Toulouse where she met the poet Walter Mehring and others who were looking to escape to the United States. The port city of Marseille, which although under control of the Vichy Regime, was not yet occupied by the Nazis. Davenport sought ways to coordinate the safe exit from France and met journalist Varian Fry, who invited her to join his staff at the Centre Américain de Secours, or American Relief Center on August 27, 1940. She persuaded him to bring on others, including a new friend and fellow American, Mary Jayne Gold, a wealthy Chicago socialite. Davenport sought out artists and other refugees, interviewed them, and determined who was most in need of help.

Davenport rented the Villa Air-Bel in Marseille with Gold and Theodora Bénédite. She invited her clients Victor Serge and André Breton and their families to move into the immense house that also became a "famous last gathering place" of the Surrealists.

The Gestapo had identified noted people that they wanted to capture.
At enormous risk to themselves, Davenport and the others ran a covert operation helping writers, artists, scientists, and academics Jews escape from France. They arranged for some of these refugees to escape over the mountains to the safety of Portugal and Spain while others they smuggled aboard freighters sailing to either North Africa or ports in North or South America.

Davenport worked on the effort until October 1940. In the less than two years that the American Relief Center were able to operate in Marseille, they were responsible for the evacuation of more than 2,000 refugees who came from all over Europe including such notable personalities as the artist Marc Chagall, Hitler biographer Konrad Heiden, artist Max Ernst, Nobel Prize winner Otto Meyerhof, and writer Franz Werfel. The consulate address was named "Place Varian Fry" in recognition of the lives he saved.

While she was in France, her fiancé, Rudolph Treo, a fellow art student, was in Ljubljana, Yugoslavia and was seriously ill. Davenport went to Ljubljana in October 1940 to get him and bring him back to Marseille, but her visa was not granted and she was unable to return to France. They lived with his parents in Ljubljana until it was annexed to Italy in April 1941. Davenport and Treo were married that month and they traveled to Switzerland along an Italian controlled road to obtain a passport for Treo. In December 12, 1941, just after the bombing of Pearl Harbor, Davenport and her husband, Professor Rudolph Treo sailed for the United States from Lisbon, Portugal on the SS Excambion.

On her return to the United States, Miriam Davenport became involved with the American Council of Learned Societies' Committee for the Protection of Cultural Treasures in War Areas for whom she helped prepare maps and documentation for use by the Allied Forces to help avoid bombing culturally important sites as well as to enable military units on the ground to secure these sites to prevent pillaging. Over the decade from 1941 to 1951, she was also involved in a number of humanitarian efforts including the International Rescue Committee, the Progressive Schools Committee for Refugee Children, the NAACP Legal Defense and Educational Fund.

Post-war life
Davenport married William L. M. ("Bill") Burke, a professor of ancient and medieval history in 1946. Burke was the Director of the Index of Christian Art at Princeton University from 1942 to 1951. He had worked with the American Council of Learned Societies (ACLS) during the war. Davenport worked at Princeton University where she oversaw the office of the Emergency Committee of Atomic Scientists for Albert Einstein. She and her husband moved to Iowa in 1951 where he had been offered a professorship at the University of Iowa.

Having settled in Iowa, Davenport began studying and making art again. While working on her graduate degree she made sculptures and paintings, which she began exhibiting and winning prizes by 1953. Her husband died very suddenly in 1961 when he reached down to pet his cat. To support herself, Davenport taught French and art to children in Riverside, Iowa.

She met archaeologist Charles Ebel who was an ancient history scholar. They were married and Davenport pursued further post-graduate studies, earning her Ph.D. in French literature from the University of Iowa in 1973. She also worked as an art instructor and taught French language courses at the university.

Dr. Ebel was hired by Central Michigan University to teach history. Davenport did a thesis on Claude Prosper Jolyot de Crébillon, an 18th-century writer.

Crossroads Marseilles, 1940
Davenport's friend Mary Jayne Gold published a book titled Crossroads Marseilles, 1940 that recounted their efforts during World War II. Although Varian Fry had died in 1967, Davenport was able to visit Marseille and to be reunited with Gold who had lived permanently on the French Riviera after the war.

Death
On September 13, 1999 Davenport died in Mt. Pleasant, Michigan of cancer. Her body was returned to Iowa for burial.

References

1915 births
1999 deaths
American humanitarians
Women humanitarians
Artists from Boston
People from Mount Pleasant, Michigan
Artists from New Rochelle, New York
Smith College alumni
New York University alumni
University of Paris alumni
American women civilians in World War II
Deaths from cancer in Michigan
American women painters
20th-century American painters
American women sculptors
20th-century American sculptors
20th-century American women artists
Activists from New York (state)
People from Delaware City, Delaware
Sculptors from New York (state)
Sculptors from Massachusetts
American expatriates in France
New Rochelle High School alumni